The Acting President of Indonesia was the position held by people who had temporarily served as the head of state of Indonesia, there are currently three people who have served as temporary presidents of Indonesia.

Sjafruddin Prawiranegara was the first person who served as the head of state of Indonesia during the Indonesian National Revolution, he led the emergency government after both Sukarno and Hatta were captured by the Dutch authorities after the second police action. Another acting president was Mr. Assaat, the head of state of the Yogyakarta-based republic from 1949 to 1950, thus it named him as one of the acting presidents of Indonesia.

Suharto served as Indonesia's acting president from 1967 to 1968 before he was sworn in as president by the parliament in 1968.

List of Acting president

See also
President of Indonesia
List of presidents of Indonesia
Vice President of Indonesia
Prime Minister of Indonesia

References

Government of Indonesia